Bajaw is the language of the Bajaw, widely known as the 'sea gypsies' of Maritime Southeast Asia. Differences exist between the language's varieties in western Sabah, Mapun (previously Cagayan de Tawi-Tawi/Sulu) in southern Philippines, eastern Sabah, and across Sulawesi to Maluku.

Distribution
West Coast Bajau is distributed in the following locations of Sabah, Malaysia (Ethnologue).
scattered along the west coast from Papar district to Kudat district, mainly in Tuaran and Kota Belud towns
Telutu’ village, Banggi Island, Kudat district
Pitas district: along the west coast and Mengkubau Laut, Mengkapon, Dalima’, Mapan-Mapan, Pantai Laut, Layag-Layag, Mausar, Jambangan, Sibayan Laut, and Kanibungan villages

Indonesian Bajau is widely distributed throughout Sulawesi and Nusa Tenggara. It is also located throughout Maluku Utara Province in the Bacan Islands, Obi Islands, Kayoa, and Sula Islands, which are located to the southwest of Halmahera Island (Ethnologue).

Mapun is spoken on Cagayan de Sulu (Mapun) island, Tawi-Tawi, Philippines.

Population
Ethnologue lists the following population statistics for Bajaw.

West Coast Bajau: 55,000 in Sabah, Malaysia (2000 SIL)
Indonesian Bajau: 150,000 in Indonesia (Mead et al. 2007)
5,000 or more in North Maluku (Grimes 1982)
8,000 to 10,000 in South Sulawesi (Grimes and Grimes 1987)
7,000 in North Sulawesi and Gorontalo
36,000 in Central Sulawesi
40,000 in Southeast Sulawesi (Mead et al. 2007)
several thousand in Nusa Tenggara (Wurm and Hattori 1981, Verheijen 1986)
Mapun: 43,000 in the Philippines; 15,000 Mapun people in Sabah, Malaysia (2011 SIL)
20,000 in Mapun island
5,000 to 10,000 Mapun people in Palawan

Phonology 
The following are the sounds of west coast Bajaw:

  can be heard as a retroflex lateral  in word-final position.
  can be heard as a flap  when in intervocalic position.

The vowel sounds  are heard as  within closed syllables.

Dialects
Ethnologue lists the following Bajaw dialects. Locations and demographics are from Palleson (1985).

West Coast Bajau
Kota Belud: Kota Belud, 60 km north of Kota Kinabalu
Putatan
Papar: Papar, 50 km south of Kota Kinabalu
Banggi: Banggi Island, north of Kudat in the north of Sabah
Sandakan
Pitas
Kawang: Kawang, 40 km south of Kota Kinabalu
Indonesian Bajau
Jampea
Same’
Matalaang
Sulamu: Sulamu, Kupang Bay, southern Timor. 400 speakers.
Kajoa: Kajoa Island, 80 km south of Ternate off the west coast of Halmahera
Roti: Roti Island, southwest of Timor. Fewer than 200 speakers.
Jaya Bakti: Jaya Bakti, Banggai Regency, central Sulawesi. 3,000 speakers.
Poso: Polande, Poso Regency, on the southeast coast of the Gulf of Poso, central Sulawesi
Togian 1: Pulaw Enaw, just off the south coast of Togian Island, Gulf of Tomini, Sulawesi
Togian 2: Togian Islands, Gulf of Tomini, Sulawesi
Wallace: exact location unknown, probably central Moluccas. 117 words collected by Alfred Russel Wallace around 1860.

Together, West Coast Bajau, Indonesian Bajau, and Mapun comprise a Borneo Coast Bajaw branch in Ethnologue.

Further reading

References

 
 
 Pallesen, A. Kemp. 1985. Culture contact and language convergence. Philippine journal of linguistics: special monograph issue, 24. Manila: Linguistic Society of the Philippines.
  (word lists of 16 Indonesian Bajau varieties spoken in Sulawesi)

Sama–Bajaw languages
Languages of Indonesia
Languages of Malaysia
Languages of the Philippines